Olivier Cotte (born 10 September 1972) is a French former freestyle skier. He competed at the 1994 Winter Olympics and the 1998 Winter Olympics.

References

External links
 

1972 births
Living people
French male freestyle skiers
Olympic freestyle skiers of France
Freestyle skiers at the 1994 Winter Olympics
Freestyle skiers at the 1998 Winter Olympics
People from Voiron
Sportspeople from Isère